MAT was an experiment to measure the anisotropy of the Cosmic microwave background at angular scales of 50 < l < 400.

See also
Cosmic microwave background experiments
Observational cosmology

Cosmic microwave background experiments